Stavros Niarchos may refer to:

 Stavros Niarchos (1909–1996), Greek shipping magnate
 Stavros Niarchos III, Stavros Niarchos's grandson and an heir
 Stavros S Niarchos, a British brig-rigged tall ship

See also
Stavros Niarchos Foundation
Stavros Niarchos Foundation Cultural Center